Tupuri (or Toupouri) is a language mostly spoken in the Mayo-Kebbi Est Region of southern Chad and in small parts of northern Cameroon. It is an Mbum language spoken by the Tupuri people with approximately 300,000 speakers.

Tupuri was erroneously classified as a Chadic language by Joseph Greenberg, due to a vocabulary list that is actually that of Kera (cf. K. Ebert 1974).

Distribution
Tupuri is predominantly spoken in the southeastern part of the Moulvouday plain, in:
Kaélé, Porhi, Taibong villages in Moulvouday commune
Guidigis commune, in Mayo-Kani department
Kar-Hay, Kalfou, Datcheka, Tchatibali communes in Mayo-Danay department

The Viri or Wina are ethnically Tupuri, but today they speak a Massa dialect.

Tupuri is also spoken in Chad. In Cameroon, it has about 125,000 speakers (SIL 2000).

References

Languages of Chad
Languages of Cameroon
Mbum languages
Tupuri